The Escape Nightclub, also known as Escape Club or The Escape, was an all-ages LGBT-friendly nightclub in Portland, Oregon, in the United States.

History
In 2016, it was announced in the Portland Tribune that the space formerly occupied was going to serve as a homeless shelter to temporarily house transients with expected opening by Thanksgiving day in 2016.

On February 1, 2017, Willamette Week reported that Escape had closed four months prior to the news story publication after operating for fourteen years.

Jerick Hoffer, the drag performer who uses the stage name Jinkx Monsoon, stated, "The very first time I performed in drag on a large scale was at the Escape."

References

2000s establishments in Oregon
2016 disestablishments in Oregon
Defunct LGBT nightclubs in Oregon
Defunct nightclubs in Portland, Oregon
LGBT culture in Portland, Oregon
Southwest Portland, Oregon